Eric Meeks (born January 15, 1965) is an American professional golfer.  

Meeks won the 1988 U.S. Amateur. He played in the 1988 Eisenhower Trophy and in the 1989 Walker Cup match. He played his college golf for the Arizona Wildcats.

Meeks later turned professional and played on the Nike Tour/Nationwide Tour, where he had two runner-up finishes: 2001 Siouxland Open and 2002 Price Cutter Charity Championship. He also played on the Asian PGA Tour, finishing 8th on the Order of Merit in 1999.

U.S. national team appearances
Amateur
Eisenhower Trophy: 1988
Walker Cup: 1989

References

External links

American male golfers
Arizona Wildcats men's golfers
PGA Tour golfers
Asian Tour golfers
1965 births
Living people